Charles Leighton (24 June 1921 – 26 June 2009) was an American classical and jazz harmonica player who performed from the mid-1940s to the mid-1950s. After a hiatus while he managed a recording studio, he performed again in the 1980s until his death. He performed as a soloist and as a member of international ensembles. He worked as a studio musician for radio, film, and television.

In the 1950s, Leighton founded JAC Recording, a small recording studio in his apartment in Manhattan. Several years later, the studio hired record producer Phil Ramone, who was mentored by Leighton and other audio engineers. Ramone attributes his love of engineering to Leighton.

Career 
Charles Leighton, a native New Yorker, taught himself to play the harmonica at the age of twelve. At age sixteen (1937), he toured the U.S., playing lead harmonica in vaudeville theaters with harmonica groups such as the Philharmonicas 
and the Cappy Barra Harmonica Gentlemen. During the early 1940s, he worked in Hollywood, both in the studio and on screen, appearing in motion pictures for Columbia and RKO. He played country music on the radio with the Hollywood Barn Dance and The Hoagy Carmichael Show. He recorded with the Andrews Sisters, Johnny Bond, Merle Travis, and the Riders of the Purple Sage.

Leighton served in the U.S. Coast Guard during World War II. After the war, he returned to New York and signed with USO Camp Shows and toured throughout Japan, Korea, and China, entertaining the military. While in the Coast Guard, he formed a trio with Harry Halicki and Joe Pittello. They toured after the war in the show Tars and Spars. They performed with Henry Morgan, Paul Whiteman, and Kay Kyser. After touring with the USO, Leighton returned to New York City to work as a studio musician, playing on radio and television commercials and recording with Harry Belafonte, Hugh Downs, Clint Eastwood, Andre Kostelanetz, Dean Martin, Mitch Miller, Dinah Shore, and Dionne Warwick.

In the 1950s Leighton co-founded and operated JAC Recording, Inc., a recording studio, and abandoned performing. Years later a friend asked him to practice and record a harmonica transcription of a flute solo called "Poem" by Charles Griffes. Never having heard the piece and underestimating its difficulty, Leighton agreed to do it. He produced a studio recording, which motivated him to record a classical music album.

For nearly 30 years until his death, Leighton hosted jam sessions at his apartment every Tuesday. He called it "Tuesdays at Leighton's". Members included Charles Spranklin, William Galison, Randy Weinstein, Stan Harper, Stanley Silverstone, Gregoire Maret, Phil Caltabelotta, and Rob Paparozzi.

Discography

As leader

As sideman

As engineer

Publications 
 Charles Leighton, Introduction to Jazz for the Chromatic Harmonica (book & audio tape), arranged and accompanied by Ted Simons on piano, The F & R Farrell Company (publisher & distributor), Grove City, Ohio (internet & mail-order harmonica retailer, now out of business) (1990) — An audio tape has harmonica alone on one side and harmonica with piano on the other side

Notes and references

Notes

References 

Jazz harmonica players
American harmonica players
American audio engineers
1921 births
2009 deaths
20th-century American musicians
20th-century American engineers
United States Coast Guard personnel of World War II